The 1997 Indian Federation Cup Final was the 20th final of the Indian Federation Cup, the top knock-out competition in India, and was contested between Kolkata giant East Bengal and Salgaocar of Goa on 20 July 1997 at the Salt Lake Stadium in Kolkata.

Salgaocar won the final 2–1 courtesy of a Golden goal by Bruno Coutinho in the extra-time to claim their third Federation Cup title.

Route to the final

East Bengal

East Bengal entered the 1997 Indian Federation Cup as the defending champions. In the pre-quarter finals, East Bengal faced Integral Coach Factory and won 3–0 with goals from Naushad Moosa, Renedy Singh and Arumugam Saravanan. In the quarter-finals, East Bengal defeated Mohammedan Sporting 4–0 as Nazimul Haq scored twice, Naushad Moosa and Bhaichung Bhutia scored the other two. In the semi-finals, East Bengal defeated their arch-rivals Mohun Bagan 4–1 in the famous Diamond Derby in front of a record 131,781 crowd at the Salt Lake Stadium. Bhaichung Bhutia scored a hattrick while Nazimul Haq scored the other for East Bengal. Chima Okorie scored the only goal for Bagan as East Bengal reached their fourth consecutive final.

Salgaocar

Salgaocar entered the 1997 Indian Federation Cup as one of the National League teams. In the pre-quarter finals, Salgaocar defeated Mizo Highlanders 6–0 to reach the last eight of the tournament where they faced Border Security Force. In the quarter-finals, Salgaocar defeated Border Security force 4–3 via penalty shootout after the game ended 1–1 after added extra time. Bruno Coutinho scored for Salgaocar while Prasanta Das had scored for BSF. In the semi-finals, Salgaocar faced the runner-up from the previous edition Dempo and won 1–0 courtesy of a solitary goal from Bruno Coutinho as they reached the final.

Match

Details

See also
 20th "Kalyani Black Label" Federation Cup 1997

References

East Bengal Club matches
Salgaocar FC matches
Indian Federation Cup Finals